IEEE Transactions on Games is a quarterly journal of the IEEE Computational Intelligence Society that publishes peer-reviewed articles covering scientific, technical, and engineering aspects of games. The editor-in-chief is Georgios N. Yannakakis.

History 
The journal started as IEEE Transactions on Computational Intelligence and AI in Games in 2009 and was renamed to IEEE Transactions on Games in 2017.

Conferences
The Annual IEEE Conference on Games (CoG) is held in various locations around the world. In 2022 CoG is hosted in Beijing, China through a virtual conference 21-24 August.

References

External links 

Computer science journals
IEEE academic journals